David Angus Barr (born November 30, 1960) is a Canadian former professional ice hockey right winger who played 13 seasons in the National Hockey League for the Boston Bruins, New York Rangers, St. Louis Blues, Hartford Whalers, Detroit Red Wings, New Jersey Devils and Dallas Stars. He was previously an assistant coach for the Florida Panthers (June 2016 - July 2017), Buffalo Sabres (July 2015- June 2016), New Jersey Devils (July 2011 - December 2014), Minnesota Wild (July 2009 – April 2011), Colorado Avalanche (July 2008 – June 2009), and the San Jose Sharks  (July 2017 - December 2019).  Head Coach, 2021 Canada U18 at world championships won gold beating Russia 5-3 in the gold medal game. Barr was born in Toronto, Ontario, but grew up in Edmonton, Alberta.

Playing career
After a nomadic junior career in which he played for the Billings Bighorns, Edmonton Oil Kings, Great Falls Americans, Portland Winter Hawks and Lethbridge Broncos of the Western Hockey League, Barr turned pro and went on to play a total of 614 regular season games in the National Hockey League, notching 128 goals and 204 assists, for a total of 332 points, along with 520 PIM over his thirteen seasons. Because of his skill, work ethic and grit, Barr also became a valuable journeyman in the NHL – playing with seven different teams – including stops in Boston, New York (NYR), St. Louis, Hartford Detroit, New Jersey and Dallas. Following the NHL, he closed out his playing career with the IHL's Kalamazoo Wings and Orlando Solar Bears (where he was a player/assistant coach).

Post-playing career
After his retirement as an active player, he continued with coaching, first as an assistant and then becoming the head coach of the Houston Aeros of the International Hockey League in the 2000–01 season. He also served as general manager for the Aeros for two seasons (2001–03), including winning the Calder Cup in 2003, as the Aeros were one of six IHL teams to join the American Hockey League (AHL) in 2001 when the IHL folded. Following his AHL success, he was the general manager and then general manager/head coach of the Guelph Storm of the OHL from 2003–08, where his team won the OHL Championship in 2003–04 and Barr collected the Matt Leyden Trophy, emblematic of the league's Coach of the Year, in 2005–06. Barr was also named as the head coach of Canada's National Men's Summer Under-18 Team for the Under-18 Ivan Hlinka Memorial Tournament from August 14–18, 2007, in the Czech Republic and Slovakia.  Barr left the OHL to become an assistant coach for the Colorado Avalanche of the NHL during the 2008–09 NHL season, but following a disappointing year in which they finished last overall in the NHL's Western Conference, the Avalanche cleaned house and fired their entire coaching staff. On July 3, 2009 the Minnesota Wild hired Dave Barr as an assistant coach. Barr was dismissed, along with head coach Todd Richards, by the Wild on April 11, 2011 in a Minnesota coaching staff restructuring. On July 29, 2011, Barr was named assistant coach of the New Jersey Devils, joining new coach Peter DeBoer on the staff. Barr was subsequently dismissed, along with head coach Peter DeBoer, by the Devils on December 27, 2014 in a New Jersey coaching staff restructuring.  On June 18, 2015, Dan Bylsma named him, along with Terry Murray as assistant coaches of the Buffalo Sabres. On July 25, 2017 he was hired as an assistant coach for the San Jose Sharks to once again work under head coach Peter DeBoer, until he was fired along with the rest of the Sharks' coaching staff on December 11, 2019.

2021 head coach Canada U18 at world championships won gold beating Russia 5-3 in the gold medal game

Career statistics

Regular season and playoffs

Coaching record

Awards and achievements
 He won the 1983–84 CHL Championship (Adams Cup) as a member of the Tulsa Oilers team coached by Tom Webster.
 2005–06 Matt Leyden Trophy winner

References

External links
 

1960 births
Living people
Billings Bighorns players
Boston Bruins players
Buffalo Sabres coaches
Canadian expatriate ice hockey players in the United States
Canadian ice hockey coaches
Canadian ice hockey right wingers
Colorado Avalanche coaches
Dallas Stars players
Detroit Red Wings players
Edmonton Oil Kings (WCHL) players
Florida Panthers coaches
Great Falls Americans players
Guelph Storm coaches
Hartford Whalers players
Ice hockey people from Toronto
Kalamazoo Wings (1974–2000) players
Lethbridge Broncos players
Minnesota Wild coaches
New Jersey Devils coaches
New Jersey Devils players
New York Rangers players
Orlando Solar Bears (IHL) players
Pincher Creek Panthers players
Portland Winterhawks players
St. Louis Blues players
San Jose Sharks coaches
Ice hockey people from Edmonton
Tulsa Oilers (1964–1984) players
Undrafted National Hockey League players